Getahun is a male given name of Ethiopian origin that may refer to:

Birhan Getahun (born 1991), Ethiopian male steeplechase runner
Bruktawit Getahun, a.k.a. Betty G, Ethiopian singer and songwriter
Yodit Getahun (born 1985), Ethiopian beauty pageant contestant

Ethiopian given names
Amharic-language names